Sombor Airport  (Serbian Latin: Aerodrom Sombor, Cyrillic: Аеродром Сомбор) is an airport in Serbia, located 7 km from the city of Sombor and 9 km from the town of Apatin between villages Kupusina and Prigrevica.

The airport is used as a military one, but there is an interest of foreign investors to be also used as a public one, mostly by tourists.

History
The Germans built the airport in 1944 (1,200 meters long and 60 meters wide concrete runway) during the Axis occupation of the Bačka region.

During the NATO Bombings of the Federal Republic of Yugoslavia in 1999, the airport was badly damaged.

Airport future 
The consortium of airport owners from Italy, led by the councillor in the Government of Italy, Adel Bertolini, spoke in Apatin with the management of that municipality about the possibility of adaptation of the existing military airport in Sombor into a centre for cargo and passenger transportation.

On the suggestion of the mayor of the municipality of Apatin, Živorad Smiljanić, it was agreed that the representatives of the Italian consortium should send the letter of intent in which they should define the conditions for design of feasibility study and the name of the potential investor. 
The Ministry of Defence of Serbia must first give consent for turning a military airport into a civilian one.

Also delegation of FlyBalaton Airport, which is owner of two airports in Hungary, is interested in turning Sombor Airport into a civil one, in cooperation with the biggest low-cost airline, Ryanair, because the Sombor Airport has a better position than the Osijek Airport.

See also 
Sombor Airport (not in use) hardly damaged due to the NATO aggression in 1999
List of airports in Serbia

External links

 JP Aerodrom Sombor
 Sombor, Vršac, Ponikve is in the transport master plan of Serbia, funded by the European Agency for Reconstruction
 Deo aerodroma na prodaju
 Foreigners want to buy Sombor Airport
 Mađari žele somborski aerodrom - 03.04.2007, 15:29, Izvor: Beta, Sombor -- Mađarska kompanija "Flaj Balaton" zainteresovana je za somborski vojni aerodrom, izjavio je predsednik opštine Sombor
 Slavković je novinarima najavio dolazak delegacije firme "FlyBalaton" koja je pokazala veliko zanimanje za aktiviranje somborskog aerodroma. Ova firma je vlasnik dva aerodroma u Mađarskoj u saradnji sa najpoznatijom low cost company "Ryanair".
 Sombor Airport photo
 Sombor Airport map
 Sombor Airport information (PDF)

Airports in Serbia
Buildings and structures in Vojvodina
Bačka
Sombor
Yugoslav Air Force bases